E 011 is a European B class road in Kazakhstan and Kyrgyzstan, connecting the cities Kokpek - Kegen – Tyup

Route 

 : Kokpek – Kegen – border of Kyrgyzstan

  ЭМ-08 Road: Border of Kazakhstan - Sary-Tologoy - Tüp

External links 
 UN Economic Commission for Europe: Overall Map of E-road Network (2007)

International E-road network
European routes in Kazakhstan
Roads in Kyrgyzstan